Point Woronzof Park (also known as The Neverlands, or Seven Hills Ski Park) is a municipal park in Anchorage, Alaska known for its views of Denali.  The park is excellent for backcountry skiing or snowshoeing in the winter, and biking or running in the summer.

The park is home to flora and fauna similar to its larger neighbor, Kincaid Park (accessible several kilometers down the Coastal Trail.)  Fox, lynx, and many moose are known to inhabit the park.  Trees are mostly Birch (especially on the hills), Spruce, cottonwood, and Alder. Devil's Club and Elderberry are endemic.

This  park is located next to the Knik Arm of Cook Inlet, between Pt. Woronzof and Pt. Campbell (Kincaid Park).  The park is bounded on the West by the ocean (which the Tony Knowles Coastal Trail runs along), the North by municipal lands associated with the Sewage Treatment Plant (STP), the east by airport land (an STP powerline easement marks the boundary), the south by Heritage Land Bank lands and airport lands (an overhead powerline marks the boundary). In addition, a Phillips gasline right-of-way crosses the park near its southern end. Point Woronzof (which includes a large parking lot overlooking Cook Inlet with a view of Mount Susitna that is frequented by sunset viewers in summer months) is actually not within Point Woronzof Park, but located about 1 mile to the north.

References

Parks in Alaska
Protected areas of Anchorage, Alaska